Cossulus stertzi is a moth in the family Cossidae. It is found in Afghanistan, Kyrgyzstan and Tajikistan.

References

Natural History Museum Lepidoptera generic names catalog

Moths described in 1887
Cossinae
Moths of Asia